This is a list of 106 species in Pedicia, a genus of hairy-eyed crane flies in the family Pediciidae.

Pedicia species

 Pedicia aethiops Alexander, 1955 i
 Pedicia albivitta Walker, 1848 i c g b  (giant eastern crane fly)
 Pedicia albivittata  i g
 Pedicia ampla Doane, 1900 i
 Pedicia aperta (Coquillett, 1905) i
 Pedicia apusenica Ujvarosi and Stary, 2003 c g
 Pedicia arctica Frey, 1921 c g
 Pedicia aspidoptera (Coquillett, 1905) i
 Pedicia auripennis (Osten Sacken, 1859) i b
 Pedicia autumnalis (Alexander, 1917) i b
 Pedicia baikalica (Alexander, 1930) c g
 Pedicia bellamyana Alexander, 1964 i c g
 Pedicia bianchii Alexander, 1966 i
 Pedicia bicomata Alexander, 1943 i
 Pedicia bidentifera Alexander, 1950 i
 Pedicia brachycera Alexander, 1933 c g
 Pedicia brevifurcata (Alexander, 1919) i
 Pedicia calcar (Osten Sacken, 1859) i
 Pedicia cascadensis Alexander, 1954 i
 Pedicia cervina (Alexander, 1917) i
 Pedicia cinereicolor Alexander, 1958 i g
 Pedicia claggi (Alexander, 1930) i
 Pedicia cockerelli Alexander, 1925 c g
 Pedicia constans (Doane, 1900) i
 Pedicia contermina Walker, 1848 i c g b
 Pedicia cubitalis Alexander, 1933 c g
 Pedicia daimio (Matsumura, 1916) c g
 Pedicia debilis (Williston, 1893) i g
 Pedicia degenerata (Alexander, 1917) i
 Pedicia depressiloba Alexander, 1945 c g
 Pedicia diaphana (Doane, 1900) i g
 Pedicia dispar Savchenko, 1978 c g
 Pedicia ericarum Alexander, 1966 c g
 Pedicia euryptera Alexander, 1949 i g
 Pedicia exoloma (Doane, 1900) i
 Pedicia falcifera Alexander, 1941 i c g
 Pedicia fenderiana Alexander, 1954 i
 Pedicia fimbriatula Alexander, 1953 c g
 Pedicia frigida (Alexander, 1919) i
 Pedicia fulvicolor Alexander, 1945 i
 Pedicia fusca Ujvarosi and Balint, 2012 c g
 Pedicia gaudens (Alexander, 1925) c g
 Pedicia gifuensis Kariya, 1934 c g
 Pedicia gigantea Alexander, 1940 i
 Pedicia glacialis (Alexander, 1917) i
 Pedicia goldsworthyi Petersen, 2006 c g
 Pedicia grandior (Alexander, 1923) c g
 Pedicia huffae Alexander, 1940 i
 Pedicia hynesiana Alexander, 1961 i
 Pedicia inconstans (Osten Sacken, 1859) i b
 Pedicia issikiella Alexander, 1953 c g
 Pedicia johnsoni (Alexander, 1930) i
 Pedicia katahdin (Alexander, 1914) i
 Pedicia kuwayamai Alexander, 1966 c g
 Pedicia laetabilis Alexander, 1938 c g
 Pedicia lewisiana Alexander, 1958 i c g
 Pedicia littoralis (Meigen, 1804) c g
 Pedicia lobifera Savchenko, 1986 c g
 Pedicia macateei (Alexander, 1919) i
 Pedicia magnifica (Hine, 1903) i c g
 Pedicia margarita Alexander, 1929 i c g
 Pedicia monophilus  i g
 Pedicia nawai Kariya, 1934 c g
 Pedicia nielseni (Slipka, 1955) c g
 Pedicia norikurae Alexander, 1958 c g
 Pedicia obtusa Osten Sacken, 1877 i c g
 Pedicia occulta (Meigen, 1830) c g
 Pedicia pahasapa Alexander, 1958 i
 Pedicia pallens Savchenko, 1978 c g
 Pedicia pallida Savchenko, 1976 c g
 Pedicia paludicola (Alexander, 1916) i
 Pedicia parvicellula Alexander, 1938 i c g b
 Pedicia patens Alexander, 1938 c g
 Pedicia perangusta Alexander, 1958 i g
 Pedicia persica Alexander, 1975 c g
 Pedicia procteriana Alexander, 1939 i c g b
 Pedicia protea (Alexander, 1918) i
 Pedicia pumila Alexander, 1942 i
 Pedicia rainieria (Alexander, 1924) i
 Pedicia riedeli (Lackschewitz, 1940) c g
 Pedicia rivosa (Linnaeus, 1758) c g
 Pedicia rubiginosa (Alexander, 1931) i
 Pedicia savtshenkoi Paramonov, 2009 c g
 Pedicia semireducta Savchenko, 1978 c g
 Pedicia septentrionalis  i g
 Pedicia seticauda (Alexander, 1924) c g
 Pedicia setipennis (Alexander, 1931) c g
 Pedicia shastensis Alexander, 1958 i
 Pedicia simplicistyla (Alexander, 1930) i
 Pedicia simulata Alexander, 1938 c g
 Pedicia smithae Alexander, 1941 i
 Pedicia spinifera Stary, 1974 c g
 Pedicia staryi Savchenko, 1978 c g
 Pedicia straminea (Meigen, 1838) c g
 Pedicia subfalcata Alexander, 1941 c g
 Pedicia subobtusa Alexander, 1949 i c g
 Pedicia subtransversa Alexander, 1933 c g
 Pedicia tacoma Alexander, 1949 i
 Pedicia tenuiloba Alexander, 1957 c g
 Pedicia tjederi Mendl, 1974 c g
 Pedicia truncata Alexander, 1941 i g
 Pedicia unigera Alexander, 1949 i
 Pedicia vernalis Osten Sacken i
 Pedicia vetusta (Alexander, 1913) c g
 Pedicia zangheriana Nielsen, 1950 c g
 Pedicia zernyi (Lackschewitz, 1940) c g

Data sources: i = ITIS, c = Catalogue of Life, g = GBIF, b = Bugguide.net

References

Pedicia